The High Commissioner of the United Kingdom to the Bahamas is the United Kingdom's foremost diplomatic representative to the Commonwealth of The Bahamas.

History
From Bahamian independence in 1973 until 2005 there were resident High Commissioners to the Bahamas. In June 2005 the High Commission in Nassau was closed and responsibility for the Bahamas was assumed by the British High Commission in Kingston, Jamaica, the High Commissioner to Jamaica was also accredited to the Bahamas. However, the High Commission in Nassau is to reopened in 2019 with a resident High Commissioner.

List of heads of mission

High Commissioners to the Bahamas
1973–1975: Charles Treadwell
1973–1978: Peter Mennell
1978–1981: John Duncan
1981–1983: Achilles Papadopoulos
1983–1986: Peter Heap
1986–1991: Colin Mays
1991–1992: Michael Gore
1992–1996: Brian Attewell
1996–1999: Peter Young
1999–2003: Peter Heigl
2003–2005: Roderick Gemmell
2005–2009: Jeremy Cresswell (non-resident)
2010–2013: Howard Drake (non-resident)
2013–2017: David Fitton (non-resident)
2017–2019: Asif Ahmad (non-resident)
2019–2022: Sarah Dickson

2022–present: Thomas Hartley

References

Bahamas
United Kingdom
United Kingdom